Anouska Helena Koster (born 20 August 1993) is a Dutch professional racing cyclist, who currently rides for UCI Women's Continental Team .

Major results

2011
 3rd Time trial, National Junior Road Championships
2014
 5th Road race, UEC European Under-23 Road Championships
 6th Overall Gracia-Orlová
 6th Gent–Wevelgem
2015
 1st Grand Prix Gippingen
 1st  Young rider classification Energiewacht Tour
 3rd Ronde van Overijssel
 4th Road race, UEC European Under-23 Road Championships
 6th Gooik–Geraardsbergen–Gooik
2016
 1st  Road race, National Road Championships
 3rd Overall Ladies Tour of Norway
1st  Points classification
1st Stage 3
 3rd Crescent Vårgårda Women World Cup TTT
 3rd Drentse Acht van Westerveld
 7th Prudential RideLondon Grand Prix
 8th Overall Ladies Tour of Qatar
1st  Young rider classification
 9th Omloop van de IJsseldelta
2017
 1st  Overall Belgium Tour
1st  Young rider classification
1st Stage 3
 2nd Road race, National Road Championships
 2nd Overall Gracia–Orlová
1st  Points classification
1st Stage 2
 7th Trofee Maarten Wynants
 10th Cadel Evans Great Ocean Road Race
2018
 5th Overall Belgium Tour
 6th Overall Women's Herald Sun Tour
2019
 1st Stage 4 Tour Cycliste Féminin International de l'Ardèche
 7th Erondegemse Pijl
 9th MerXem Classic
 10th Overall Healthy Ageing Tour
2020
 3rd Road race, National Road Championships
2021
 1st  Mountains classification Holland Ladies Tour
 3rd Overall Kreiz Breizh Elites Dames
1st  Points classification
 6th Overall Festival Elsy Jacobs
 6th Overall Trophée des Grimpeuses
2022
 3rd Time trial, National Road Championships

See also
 List of 2015 UCI Women's Teams and riders

References

External links
 
 

1993 births
Living people
Dutch female cyclists
People from Dantumadiel
Cyclists from Friesland
20th-century Dutch women
21st-century Dutch women